Elizabeth Bye is an American politician from Connecticut. A Democrat, she is the commissioner of the state's Office of Early Childhood. She served as a member of the Connecticut State Senate from 2011 to 2019, representing the 5th district, which includes part of Bloomfield, most of Farmington, all of Burlington and all of West Hartford. Bye also served two terms in the Connecticut House of Representatives from 2007 to 2011.

Early life and education
Bye was born and raised in Greenwich, Connecticut. She graduated from St. Mary's High School (now Trinity Catholic High School in Stamford) in Greenwich in 1980 and from the University of New Hampshire with a Master of Arts degree in child development in 1989. In 2013, Bye completed Harvard University's John F. Kennedy School of Government program for Senior Executives in State and Local Government as a David Bohnett Foundation LGBTQ Victory Institute Leadership Fellow.

Professional and political career

Beth Bye was appointed as Commissioner for the Connecticut Office of Early Childhood by Governor Ned Lamont in January 2019.

Bye, who served in the Senate from 2011 to the present and in the House from 2007 through 2010, will lead an office created in 2013 to coordinate and enhance various early childhood development programs and create a cohesive early care system.

In 2013, Bye led the effort to create The Office of Early Childhood, one of the first such offices in the country.  Her work as champion for the creation of the office is informed by her own, long-term experience since 1980 as an early childhood professional.

Bye’s experience includes leadership positions at Auerfarm/Wintonbury Early Childhood Magnet School, Great by 8, the Capitol Region Education Council, and she also helped to open two early childhood magnet schools. Bye was the director at both the Trinity College Community Child Center and the University of St. Joseph School for Young Children, which was named a State of Connecticut model pre-school.

Commissioner Bye received her BA and MA in Child Development from the University of New Hampshire.

Connecticut State Legislature
A former Vice Chair of the West Hartford Board of Education, she was elected to the legislature in November 2006. She defeated Republican Barbara Carpenter, a member of the town council, by a margin of 57% to 43% and was therefore elected to succeed longtime Republican incumbent Bob Farr. Although the district had elected a Republican for the 26 years prior to her 2006 win, she nevertheless won re-election comfortably in 2008: Bye garnered 64% of the vote to her Republican opponent's 36%.

In May 2010, shortly after Sen. Jonathan Harris (D-West Hartford) announced that he would not run for another term in the senate in order to seek the Democratic nomination for secretary of the state, Bye declared her candidacy for his senate seat. She won the Democratic nomination unopposed and easily prevailed against a Republican opponent. She took office as a state senator on January 5, 2011.

In January 2019, then-incoming Governor Ned Lamont appointed Bye to lead the state Office of Early Childhood leading her to resign from the state legislature.

Personal life
A lesbian, Bye married Dr. Tracey Wilson on November 12, 2008. They were the first gay couple to be married in Connecticut. Tracey Wilson is a West Hartford town historian and the couple live with their two children and two step-children: Brittany, Caroline, Peter, and Adam; in West Hartford. As of 2018, Bye was one of two openly gay members of the Connecticut General Assembly, serving alongside Rep. Jeffrey Currey (D-East Hartford). Bye is the first member of the legislature to enter into a civil union.

Electoral history

 
 

 
 

 
 

Bye ran unopposed in both the primary and general elections in 2012.

References

External links
Campaign web site
Legislative homepage

Year of birth missing (living people)
Living people
Democratic Party members of the Connecticut House of Representatives
Lesbian politicians
LGBT state legislators in Connecticut
University of New Hampshire alumni
Women state legislators in Connecticut
Democratic Party Connecticut state senators
21st-century American politicians
21st-century American women politicians
People from Greenwich, Connecticut
Politicians from Hartford, Connecticut
21st-century American LGBT people